Andrew Rugasira is a Ugandan businessman and author. He is the author of the book A good African story: how a small company built a global coffee brand. In 2003, he founded Good African Coffee, the first African-owned coffee brand to be stocked in UK supermarkets and US retailers. In 2007, he was nominated as a Young Global Leader by the World Economic Forum. He has won several awards, including the Legatum Pioneers for Prosperity award, and in 2010 was nominated for a Financial Times/ArcelorMittal Boldness in Business award. He was Uganda Coffee Development Authority's  Ugandan Entrepreneur of the Year 2007. He was Uganda's chairman of the Eastern African Fine Coffees Association (EAFCA), a member of Uganda's Presidential Investor Roundtable (PIRT) and sits on the board of Maisha Film Lab. Rugasira lives in Kampala and is a father of five children.

Early life and education
Rugasira grew up in Kampala, Uganda. He graduated from the University of London with a degree in Law and Economics, in 1992. He has written numerous papers and articles for newspapers like the Guardian (UK), Financial Times (UK), Telegraph (UK), and New Vision (Uganda).  Rugasira is a Fellow of the Royal Society of Arts, London and has spoken there on the theme “Trade not Aid for Africa.” In June 2011, he completed an MSc in African studies at Oxford University, UK.

Good African Coffee
Good African Coffee was the first African-owned coffee brand to be listed in UK supermarkets (Waitrose, Sainsbury's and Tesco). The company works with a supply network of more than 14,000 coffee farmers in western Uganda, where the company has also developed 17 savings and credit coops for those farming communities. In addition to being available in more than 700 UK supermarkets and 500 stores in Africa, Good African Coffee is now available online in the United States.

Published works

Awards and honors
Nominated for a Financial Times/Accelor Mittal Boldness in Business Award, 2010
Nominated as a Young Global Leader by The World Economic Forum, 2007
Legatum Pioneers for Prosperity Award (2007) 
Ugandan Entrepreneur of the Year 2007,Coffee Development Authority
Business Personality of the Year (2006: Destiny, Uganda)
Coffee Entrepreneur of the Year (2006: UCDA, Uganda
Africa Vision Award (2005: African Times, LA, USA 2005)

References

External links 
"Andrew Rugasira"
"Can Coffee Kick-Start an Economy?"
"Good African Coffee wants trade, not aid"
"Businessman, Andrew Rugasira who woke up and smelt the coffee"
"A Good African Story"
"Andrew Rugasira: ‘Fair trade is not the solution’"
"“Impact is as Important as the Profit” Ugandan Social Entrepreneur Andrew Rugasira Chats with Ayeesha Durgahee on CNN’s “African Voices”"
"Andrew Rugasira: Using Coffee to Transform Uganda "
"Profile: Andrew Rugasira – founder & CEO Good African Coffee"
"A good man in Africa"
"Author – Andrew Rugasira | “A Good African Story” How A Small Company Built A Global Coffee Brand"
"When it comes to dealing with austerity, Africa wrote the textbook"
"The Forum"

Living people
People from Kampala District
Ugandan writers
Kumusha
Year of birth missing (living people)
Ugandan businesspeople